Mark Knight is a disc jockey and electronic music producer. He is the founder of Toolroom Records, one of the biggest house, tech house and dance labels of the United Kingdom.

Career
Knight founded record label Toolroom Records in 2003, which hosts artists including David Guetta, Deadmau5, and Jaguar Skills.  He has released several singles on his own label, and was nominated at the 52nd annual Grammy awards for his work on the Black Eyed Peas album The E.N.D.  Along with Funkagenda, Knight won the Track of the Season award for his release "Man with the Red Face" at the 2008 DJ Awards.

In 2015, Knight released dancefloor anthem "Second Story" which BBC Radio 1 DJ Pete Tong deemed his "essential new tune" for June, following on from being inducted into Tong's Hall of Fame that same year. Knight's debut album A Year in the Life, released in 2016, was a retrospective mix of his releases from the previous year.  His second album, Untold Business, was released in 2021.  In 2022, Knight collaborated with Lukas Setto to produce the single "Get with You Tonight", which was released to positive reviews.

References

External links
 Mark Knight official website
 

Living people
English record producers
English dance musicians
English house musicians
Club DJs
English DJs
Electronic dance music DJs
Year of birth missing (living people)